Francesco Onofrio Odierna (born 1644) was a Roman Catholic prelate who served as Titular Bishop of Berytus (1727), Bishop of Valva e Sulmona (1717–1727) and Bishop of Bitetto (1669–1717).

Biography
Francesco Onofrio Odierna (also known as Hodierna) was born in Naples, Italy in 1644. His father was the jurist Giovan Battista Odierna. He was ordained a deacon on 20 January 1669 and ordained a priest on 27 January 1669. On 24 April 1684, he was appointed during the papacy of Pope Innocent XI as Bishop of Bitetto. On 4 January 1717, he was appointed during the papacy of Pope Clement XI as Bishop of Valva e Sulmona. He served as Bishop of Valva e Sulmona until his resignation on 6 March 1727. On 17 March 1727, he was appointed during the papacy of Pope Benedict XIII as Titular Bishop of Berytus. He died in 1736.

Episcopal succession
While bishop, he was the principal co-consecrator of:
Giovanni Battista de Belli, Bishop of Telese o Cerreto Sannita (1684);
Fulvio Crivelli (Cribelli), Bishop of Tricarico (1684);
Antonio Polcenigo, Bishop of Feltre (1684);
Domenico Minio, Bishop of Caorle (1684);
Baldassare de Benavente, Bishop of Potenza (1686); and
Filippo Massarenghi, Bishop of Bitonto (1686).

References

External links and additional sources

 (for Chronology of Bishops) 
 (for Chronology of Bishops) 

1643 births
Year of death missing
17th-century Italian Roman Catholic bishops
18th-century Italian Roman Catholic bishops
Bishops appointed by Pope Innocent XI
Bishops appointed by Pope Clement XI
Bishops appointed by Pope Benedict XIII